Dialeurodes is a genus of whiteflies in the family Aleyrodidae. There are at least three described species in Dialeurodes.

Species
 Dialeurodes citri  (citrus whitefly)
 Dialeurodes citrifolii (Morgan, 1893)
 Dialeurodes kirkaldyi (Kotinsky, 1907)

References

Further reading

 

Sternorrhyncha